The 1983 Ohio State Buckeyes football team represented the Ohio State University in the 1983 NCAA Division I-A football season. The Buckeyes compiled a 9–3 record, including the 1984 Fiesta Bowl in Tempe, Arizona, where they won, 28–23, against the Pittsburgh Panthers.

Schedule

Depth chart

Personnel

Game summaries

Oregon

at Oklahoma

at Iowa

Minnesota

Purdue

at Illinois

Michigan State

Wisconsin

Woody Hayes dotted the "i" in the pregame Script Ohio.

at Indiana

Northwestern

at Michigan

vs. Pittsburgh (Fiesta Bowl)

1984 NFL draftees

References

Ohio State
Ohio State Buckeyes football seasons
Fiesta Bowl champion seasons
Ohio State Buckeyes football